Lehigh Valley Railroad Barge No. 79 is a historic barge located at The Waterfront Museum in the Red Hook neighborhood of Brooklyn, Kings County, New York. The barge was built in 1914 in Perth Amboy, New Jersey, as part of the lighter fleet operated by the Lehigh Valley Railroad to move cargoes around New York Harbor and along the lower Hudson River. It has a length on deck of 86 feet, beam of 30 feet, and draft of 2 feet, 9 inches.

It was listed on the National Register of Historic Places in 2015. Lehigh Valley Railroad Barge 79 was previously listed on the National Register in 1989 at a berth in New Jersey.

References

External links

The Waterfront Museum website

Ships on the National Register of Historic Places in New York City
1914 ships
National Register of Historic Places in Brooklyn
Red Hook, Brooklyn
Barges of the United States